Erickson Glacier is a glacier,  long, flowing north from the Queen Maud Mountains, between Mount Young and O'Leary Peak, to join Ramsey Glacier at the edge of the Ross Ice Shelf. It was named by the Advisory Committee on Antarctic Names for Commander J.L. Erickson, U.S. Navy, commanding officer of USS Staten Island during U.S. Navy Operation Deep Freeze 1965.

References 

Glaciers of Dufek Coast